Slovenia competed at the 2000 Summer Olympics in Sydney, Australia. Slovenia won their first two summer Olympic gold medals at these games.

Medalists

Archery

In Slovenia's third archery competition, the nation entered only one man, who improved his rank from four years before by one place despite losing his first match again.
Men

Athletics

Men
Track & road events

Field events

Women
Track & road events

Field events

Badminton

Canoeing

Slalom

Cycling

Road

Mountain biking

Gymnastics

Artistic
Men

Women

Handball

Men's tournament

 Aleš Pajovič
 Andrej Kastelic
 Beno Lapajne
 Branko Bedekovič
 Gregor Cvijič
 Iztok Puc
 Jani Likavec
 Renato Vugrinec
 Roman Pungartnik
 Rolando Pušnik
 Tettey-Sowah Banfro
 Tomaž Tomšič
 Uroš Šerbec
 Zoran Jovičič
 Zoran Lubej

Group B

Quarterfinal

5th / 8th place

7th / 8th place

Rowing 

Men

Sailing 

Men

Women

Open

Shooting 

Men

Women

Swimming

Men

Women

Taekwondo

Men

Tennis

Women

References

sports-reference
Wallechinsky, David (2004). The Complete Book of the Summer Olympics (Athens 2004 Edition). Toronto, Canada. . 
International Olympic Committee (2001). The Results. Retrieved 12 November 2005.
Sydney Organising Committee for the Olympic Games (2001). Official Report of the XXVII Olympiad Volume 1: Preparing for the Games. Retrieved 20 November 2005.
Sydney Organising Committee for the Olympic Games (2001). Official Report of the XXVII Olympiad Volume 2: Celebrating the Games. Retrieved 20 November 2005.
Sydney Organising Committee for the Olympic Games (2001). The Results. Retrieved 20 November 2005.
International Olympic Committee Web Site

Nations at the 2000 Summer Olympics
Olympics
2000 Summer Olympics